Yonathan Daza (born February 28, 1994) is a Venezuelan professional baseball outfielder for the Colorado Rockies of Major League Baseball (MLB).

Career
Daza signed with the Colorado Rockies as an international free agent in October 2010. He spent his first three professional seasons (2011-2013) playing for the Rookie-level DSL Rockies. He played for the Rookie-level Grand Junction Rockies in 2014, hitting .370/.415/.490/.905 with 4 home runs and 35 RBI. He split 2015 between the Class A Short Season Boise Hawks and the Class A Asheville Tourists, accumulating a .325/.358/.451/.809 batting line with 3 home runs and 53 RBI. He split his 2016 season between Asheville and the Class A-Advanced Modesto Nuts, hitting a combined .303/.338/.402./740 with 3 home runs and 61 RBI. He spent 2017 with the Class A-Advanced Lancaster JetHawks, hitting .341/.376/.466/.842 with 3 home runs and 87 RBI. Daza played for the Salt River Rafters of the Arizona Fall League after the 2017 regular season.

The Rockies added him to their 40-man roster after the 2017 season. He spent the 2018 season with the Double-A Hartford Yard Goats, hitting .306/.330/.461/.791 with 4 home runs and 29 RBI. He appeared in just 54 games in 2018 after suffering a left shoulder injury in late July of that season. Daza opened the 2019 season with the Triple-A Albuquerque Isotopes.

The Rockies promoted Daza to the major leagues for the first time on April 9, 2019, when David Dahl was placed on the injured list. Daza made his major league debut on the same day, versus the Atlanta Braves. Daza did not appear in a game for the Rockies in 2020, despite injuries to David Dahl and Ian Desmond's decision to opt out of the season due to the COVID-19 pandemic. For the majority of the 2021 season, Daza was the starting center fielder for Colorado up until his injury in August. He ended up hitting .282 with 2 home runs and 30 RBI in 107 games.

References

External links

Living people
1994 births
Major League Baseball outfielders
Major League Baseball players from Venezuela
Venezuelan expatriate baseball players in the United States
Colorado Rockies players
Dominican Summer League Rockies players
Venezuelan expatriate baseball players in the Dominican Republic
Grand Junction Rockies players
Boise Hawks players
Asheville Tourists players
Modesto Nuts players
Lancaster JetHawks players
Hartford Yard Goats players
Albuquerque Isotopes players
Salt River Rafters players
Tiburones de La Guaira players
Sportspeople from Maracay